Luca Cunti (born July 4, 1989) is a Swiss professional ice hockey forward who is currently playing for EHC Biel in the National League (NL). He previously played for the SCL Tigers, the ZSC Lions, EHC Kloten and HC Lugano. He was selected by the Tampa Bay Lightning in the 3rd round (75th overall) of the 2007 NHL Entry Draft.

Playing career 
Cunti played two North American junior seasons in the United States Hockey League and the Quebec Major Junior Hockey League before returning to his native Switzerland, unsigned from the Lightning, to continue his career with the SCL Tigers. He later moved to rivals the ZSC Lions and signed a two-year contract extension on October 19, 2011.

On April 22, 2014, Cunti was signed to a three-year contract extension by the Lions. In his final year of his contract with Zurich, Cunti agreed to a two-year contract with HC Lugano for the start of the 2017–18 season, with a reported worth of CHF2.4 million.

On January 11, 2017, Cunti was shipped to ZSC's longtime rival, EHC Kloten for the remainder of the 2016–17 season. Cunti didn't join Lugano before the end of the 2016–17 season as the Lions insisted on a clause which would have prevented Cunti from playing any game against Zurich. This clause was not accepted by Lugano and therefore, Cunti joined Kloten.

Cunti made his debut with Kloten against Lausanne HC on January 13, 2017, scoring one goal and tallying one assist. Cunti's short stint with Kloten ended on March 14, 2017, once Kloten saved itself from relegation and despite 2 games remaining in the playout round. He went on to play 16 games for Kloten, tallying 4 goals and 9 assists, before joining Lugano in the summer of 2017.

After only 11 games into the 2018–19 season, Cunti badly hurt his left shoulder, which would eventually end his season. On December 24, 2018, Cunti agreed to a two-year contract worth CHF 1.2 million with EHC Biel, starting for the 2019–20 season and through the 2020–21 season. Cunti played 54 regular season games with Lugano (25 points) over two seasons as well as 16 playoff games in 2018 (10 points), helping the team reach the final.

On February 4, 2021, Cunti agreed to a four-year contract extension with EHC Biel.

Career statistics

Regular season and playoffs

International

References

External links

1989 births
Living people
EHC Biel players
Chicago Steel players
GCK Lions players
EHC Kloten players
HC Lugano players
Olympic ice hockey players of Switzerland
Ice hockey players at the 2014 Winter Olympics
Rimouski Océanic players
SCL Tigers players
Swiss ice hockey left wingers
Tampa Bay Lightning draft picks
ZSC Lions players
Ice hockey people from Zürich